Askari Bank Ltd, formerly Askari Commercial Bank, is a commercial and retail bank in Pakistan and is owned by Fauji Foundation, part of Pakistan Army.

History
It was founded on October 9, 1991, as a public limited company. 

On June 21, 2013, the bank was acquired by Fauji Group.

In September 2020, Askari Bank it acquired Askari Securities which is now a wholly-owned subsidiary.

Branches 
Askari Bank has 560 branches across Pakistan and a wholesale bank branch in Bahrain.

Awards and recognitions
 The Asian Banker awarded twice as “Best Retail Bank in Pakistan” in 2004 and 2005.
 Askari Bank also has been given the “Best Consumer Internet Bank” award by Global Finance magazine for the years 2002 and 2003.

See also
List of banks in Pakistan

References

External links 
 Askari Bank, official website

Banks established in 1991
Banks of Pakistan
Companies listed on the Pakistan Stock Exchange
Companies based in Rawalpindi
2013 mergers and acquisitions
Fauji Foundation
Pakistani companies established in 1991